Zeisler is a surname. Notable people with the surname include:

Alfred Zeisler (1897–1985), American film producer, director, actor and screenwriter
Bat-Sheva Zeisler, Israeli vocalist, actress, and voice teacher
Claire Zeisler (1903–1991), American fiber artist who expanded the expressive qualities of knotted and braided threads
Fannie Bloomfield Zeisler (1863–1927), Austrian-born U.S. pianist
Klaus Zeisler, East German sprint canoeist who competed in the mid-1970s
Sigmund Zeisler (1860–1931), Austrian-born U.S. attorney, known for his defense of radicals in Chicago in the 1880s